"Two Separate Bar Stools" is a song written by Bill Graham. It was recorded and released as a single by American country, rock, and Christian artist, Wanda Jackson.

The song was recorded at the Columbia Recording Studio on March 29, 1969 in Nashville, Tennessee, United States. "Two Separate Bar Stools" was officially released as a single in December 1969, peaking at number thirty five on the Billboard Magazine Hot Country Singles chart. The song was issued on Jackson's 1970 studio album, Wanda Jackson Country.

Chart performance

References 

1969 singles
Wanda Jackson songs
Capitol Records singles
1969 songs